Sunita Choudhary is an Indian politician of All Jharkhand Students Union who will serve as Member of Jharkhand Legislative Assembly, representing the Ramgarh constituency.

References 

Jharkhand MLAs 2019–2024

Year of birth missing (living people)
Living people
All Jharkhand Students Union politicians